.my is the Internet country code top-level domain (ccTLD) for Malaysia. MYNIC is the agency responsible for the domain, and is under the Ministry of Communications and Digital (KKD) and regulated by the Malaysian Communication and Multimedia Commission (MCMC).

MYNIC administers the name space for the .my, .com.my, .org.my, .net.my, .edu.my, .gov.my, .mil.my, .name.my top level domain (TLD). This involves the registration of domain names as well as the maintenance and operation of a domain name registry (a central database for .my domain names).

Responsibilities

In addition, MYNIC holds the responsibility of developing top level domain policies, and carries out research projects such as:

 IPv6 (Internet Protocol version 6)
 DNSSEC (Domain Name Server Security Extensions)
 ENUM (Telephone Number Mapping)
 Anycast and IDN (Internationalised Domain Names)
 Promoting and training activities for the usage of the technologies above

Services

Registering a .my domain name
Modifying a record of a domain name already registered with MYNIC
Deleting a domain name already registered with MYNIC
Transferring a domain name already registered with MYNIC
Searching for a domain name already registered with MYNIC
News and information on the latest MYNIC policies for the .my domain
Provision of a platform for dispute resolution between the registrant of a .my domain name and a third party

Chief Executive Officer 
The following have been CEOs of MYNIC: 
 Shariya Haniz Binti Zulkifli (1 August 2006–30 October 2010)
 Tengku Intan Narqiah Binti Tengku Othman (1 February–21 December 2011)
 Muhammad Ikmaluddin Bin Ismail (3 September 2012–4 February 2013)
 YBhg. Datuk Hasnul Fadhly Bin Hasan (8 October 2013–present)

Domain Names Categories 
MYNIC administers eight (8) domain name categories, namely:

References

External links
 IANA .my whois information
 myNIC – Malaysia's mynic/registrar

Country code top-level domains
Internet in Malaysia
Computer-related introductions in 1987
Ministry of Communications and Multimedia (Malaysia)
Internet properties established in 1987

sv:Toppdomän#M